Golijan (also Romanized as Golījān) is a village in Dorudzan Rural District, Dorudzan District, Marvdasht County, Fars Province, Iran. At the 2006 census, its population was 668, in 145 families.

References 

Populated places in Marvdasht County